Tom Day Crouch (born February 28, 1944) is an American aeronautics historian and curator.

Biography

Life
Crouch was born in Dayton, Ohio and grew up just outside of Dayton in Crystal Lakes, between Medway and New Carlisle. He is a graduate of Tecumseh High School, and was inducted into the school's Hall of Honor in 2002.

Crouch attended Ohio University, where he received a Bachelor of Arts degree in history in 1966. He also attended Miami University and received a Master of Arts degree in history there in 1968. He later earned a Ph.D in history from the Ohio State University in 1976. In 2001 the Wright State University awarded him with an honorary Doctor of Humane Letters degree.

On November 2, 1963, Crouch married Nancy Anne Gochenouer. They have three children.

Career
An employee of the Ohio Historical Society, 1968–1974, Crouch planned the exhibits for the Neil Armstrong Museum, Wapakoneta, Ohio and the history exhibitions for the Ohio Historical Center. He accepted a curatorial position with the National Air and Space Museum (NASM) in 1974, and prepared exhibitions for the opening of that building in 1976. He transferred to the National Museum of American History (NMAH) in 1983, where he remained until 1990, rising to the position of Chairman, Social and Cultural History. He was involved in planning the "More Perfect Union: Japanese-Americans and the U.S. Constitution" exhibition. He was named Chairman of the Aeronautics Department of the NASM in 1990, and in 1999 was named Senior Curator, Aeronautics. Crouch was appointed by then President William J. Clinton to chair the federal advisory board planning activities commemorating the first flight of Orville and Wilbur Wright in 2003. He also participated in and worked to resolve the issues over the Enola Gay bomber being displayed at the National Air and Space Museum. Crouch is the author of some fifteen books and many articles, primarily on topics related to the history of flight technology.

He rededicated the Portal of the Folded Wings Shrine to Aviation in Burbank, California, in May 1996.

Crouch became a regular guest in the National Air and Space Museum's television show, STEM in 30. He appeared in eight episodes from 2014-2018.

Bibliography

As author

As editor

Recognitions
Crouch was awarded a 1989 Christopher Award for his book The Bishop's Boys: A Life of Wilbur and Orville Wright. In 2005 he won the AIAA Gardner-Lasser Literature Prize for the book Wings: A History of Aviation From Kites to the Space Age.

References

1944 births
Living people
Ohio University alumni
Miami University alumni
Ohio State University Graduate School alumni
American curators
21st-century American historians
American male non-fiction writers
Writers from Dayton, Ohio
People from Clark County, Ohio
Historians from Ohio
21st-century American male writers